The fifth season of the Fox musical comedy-drama television series Glee was commissioned on April 19, 2013, along with a sixth season. It premiered on September 26, 2013, as part of the 2013 fall season. After a winter break, it returned on February 25, 2014, moving to Tuesday nights to finish its season. The second part of the season featured the 100th episode of the series, the 12th episode of the season, which aired on March 18, 2014. It was shorter than previous seasons, with twenty episodes instead of twenty-two.

The series features the New Directions glee club at the fictional William McKinley High School (WMHS) in the town of Lima, Ohio, and graduates of McKinley who have moved to New York City, some to attend the fictional New York Academy of Dramatic Arts (NYADA). Unlike previous seasons, the fifth continues the school year begun in season four. The first half of the season follows the club competing on the show choir circuit, while the remainder of the season focuses on graduation and the alumni's lives in New York City as its members, faculty and alumni deal with gay bashing, death, intimacy, STDs, transphobia and other social issues. The central characters are glee club director Will Schuester (Matthew Morrison), cheerleading coach and school principal Sue Sylvester (Jane Lynch), glee club members Artie Abrams (Kevin McHale), Blaine Anderson (Darren Criss), Tina Cohen-Chang (Jenna Ushkowitz), Sam Evans (Chord Overstreet) and graduates Rachel Berry (Lea Michele), Kurt Hummel (Chris Colfer), and Santana Lopez (Naya Rivera). Previously recurring characters Jake Puckerman (Jacob Artist), Marley Rose (Melissa Benoist), Ryder Lynn (Blake Jenner), Wade "Unique" Adams (Alex Newell), and Kitty Wilde (Becca Tobin), who are current glee club members at WMHS, have been promoted to the main cast in the fifth season—though none of them appear in the last trimester, seven episodes, of the season, as the season moves its focus to the alumni. Heather Morris, Amber Riley, Mark Salling, and Harry Shum, Jr., who have portrayed Brittany Pierce, Mercedes Jones, Noah "Puck" Puckerman and Mike Chang (respectively) since season one, are no longer series regulars, but did appear as guest stars.

This is the first season not to feature Cory Monteith, who died shortly before production was scheduled to begin. The death of Monteith's character, Finn Hudson, was the subject of the third episode, "The Quarterback", which paid tribute to them both. The series went on hiatus after the third episode, and resumed airing episodes after the baseball postseason.

The season was nominated for one Emmy Award for Outstanding Directing for a Comedy Series.

Episodes

Production
The season's production was set to begin in mid-July, with shooting commencing July 29, 2013. On July 18, 2013, it was announced the show would go on a two-week hiatus while its writers and producers rewrote the storylines and figured out how to handle the death of Monteith's character, Finn Hudson. On July 19, 2013, the show announced through their Facebook page that the season would premiere September 26, one week after the original date, and filming would begin in early August. The season ultimately began shooting on August 5, 2013, a week later than originally planned, though studio recording and costume fittings for the cast began four days earlier.

On July 20, 2013, Ryan Murphy stated in an interview that Monteith's character would die in the third episode of the season and that episodes one and two will be tribute episodes to the Beatles. Lea Michele, Monteith's girlfriend who also stars as Rachel Berry on the show, was involved in the decision. After the third episode was completed, there was another hiatus while the creative team reworked the rest of the season. The show returned after the baseball postseason was over, and aired five episodes in a row without interruption.

For the 100th episode, Fox ran a promotion called "Gleeks Choice" at the end of November 2013 where fans could choose ten songs from a list of thirty that were performed in the past episodes of the series. The ten songs that received the most votes would be featured in the episode. The list of thirteen songs that was eventually released in late February 2014 for the two-part 100th episode contained eight songs from the original thirty-song list, not ten.

On March 17, 2014, it was revealed that Chris Colfer would write an episode. It was later revealed that he will be writing the nineteenth episode of the season.

Cast
Fox credits fourteen main cast members for the season: Matthew Morrison as glee club director Will Schuester; Jane Lynch as cheerleading coach Sue Sylvester; Chris Colfer, Lea Michele and Naya Rivera as McKinley graduates and former glee club members Kurt Hummel, Rachel Berry and Santana Lopez, respectively; and Jacob Artist, Melissa Benoist, Darren Criss, Blake Jenner, Kevin McHale, Alex Newell, Chord Overstreet, Becca Tobin and Jenna Ushkowitz as current glee club members Jake Puckerman, Marley Rose, Blaine Anderson, Ryder Lynn, Artie Abrams, Wade "Unique" Adams, Sam Evans, Kitty Wilde and Tina Cohen-Chang, respectively. Five actors received contractual upgrades, having formerly been recurring cast members: Artist, Benoist, Jenner, Newell and Tobin. Five actors depart the main cast: Cory Monteith (Finn Hudson), who died on July 13, 2013; and Heather Morris (Brittany Pierce), Amber Riley (Mercedes Jones), Mark Salling (Noah "Puck" Puckerman) and Harry Shum, Jr. (Mike Chang). Riley, Salling and Shum have been listed among the guest cast for this season. Murphy tweeted on December 3, 2013, that he had asked all original cast members to return for the 100th episode — Riley, Salling and Shum returned, and Morris made her season five debut in this episode alongside Dianna Agron, who portrays Quinn Fabray. Kristin Chenoweth and Gwyneth Paltrow, April Rhodes and Holly Holliday on Glee, respectively, also returned for the 100th episode.

Two former main cast members, who appeared as recurring guest stars in the fourth season, have been cast in series regular roles in new television shows: Mike O'Malley on Welcome to the Family, and Jayma Mays on The Millers. O'Malley and Mays also confirmed their appearances. NeNe Leakes also returned as a recurring guest, by which point Dot-Marie Jones already filmed scenes for the season's third episode. Trisha Rae Stahl, who plays McKinley lunch lady (and Marley's mother) Millie Rose, appeared as well. Chace Crawford appeared on Glee'''s 100th episode as a Yale student named Biff who was also Quinn's new boyfriend. Iqbal Theba was also slated to return as a recurring character.

Ryan Murphy announced that Adam Lambert would join the cast during the fifth season; Chris Colfer later revealed that Lambert is to play the "nemesis" to Colfer's character, Kurt Hummel, who is a student at the New York Academy of Dramatic Arts (NYADA). It was initially reported that Demi Lovato was in negotiations to join the cast for a six-episode arc starting with the season's second episode as Dani, a friend of Santana (Naya Rivera) and Rachel (Michele) in New York, who also would interact and sing with Lambert's character; the show subsequently confirmed that Lovato would be joining the show. However, Lovato only appeared four episodes during the season, due to her commitments of The Neon Lights Tour. Lea Michele tweeted on August 22, 2013, that her friend Phoebe Strole would be appearing on Glee during the season; her character, Penny Owen, was a sophomore in college and a new love interest for Sam Evans (Chord Overstreet). Erinn Westbrook was  cast as a new recurring McKinley cheerleader, Bree, said to be a "mean girl".

Early on, there were reports of seven new recurring characters being cast: three women and four men. The former included Ruby, a new African-American student at McKinley High, and two women in their twenties, Ryan, who sings and plays the guitar, and a "cute and quirky" character variously named Julie and Jenny, who will first appear in the second episode. So far, three characters have appeared that fit these descriptions, albeit with different names: an African-American student at McKinley High named Bree (played by Westbrook), a guitar-playing woman named Dani (Lovato), and Penny Owens. The four males include three men in their forties or fifties: the talented and egotistical Roderick Easton; an intelligent and good-looking teacher named Jim Elliott; and Jurgen, who speaks with an Austrian or German accent. The fourth, Henry, has just been reported by name. A character who would end up fitting the description of a man with a German or Austrian accent in his forties or fifties is Gunther (Christopher Curry), who runs the Spotlight Diner.

Reception

Critical response
The review aggregator website Rotten Tomatoes gives the season a 71% with an average rating of 7.5/10, based on 14 reviews. The site's critics consensus reads, "Glee finds beauty in tragedy during a season that cathartically addresses the untimely passing of star Cory Monteith, while finding some new grace notes among its expansive ensemble, but the series is still indulging in the soporific tropes and cheesy self-seriousness that some viewers have come to dread."

Ratings
Measurements of live plus same day (DVR) viewers fell considerably, relative to previous seasons. While season 4 saw the first viewership numbers below 6 million for an episodes, season 5 saw the first viewership numbers to fall below 2 million an episode. 

Live + SD Ratings

Home video releasesGlee: The Complete Fifth Season'' was released on January 6, 2015 in DVD, with 6-set discs. The Blu-ray only has a Japan release and is a 4 disc set.

References

2013 American television seasons
2014 American television seasons
 5